David Adams may refer to:

Government officials
 David S. Adams (State Department) (born 1961), Assistant Secretary of State for Legislative Affairs
 David Adams (Labour politician) (1871–1943), British Labour Party Member of Parliament, 1922–1923 and 1935–1943
 David Adams (Australian politician) (born 1930), Australian Capital Territory politician
 David Adams (loyalist) (born c. 1953), Northern Irish loyalist activist and former politician
 Dave Adams (naval officer), officer in the US Navy
 David Morgan Adams (1875–1942), British Member of Parliament for Poplar South, 1931–1942

Sports
 David Adams (dancer) (1928–2007), Canadian ballet dancer
 David Adams (baseball) (born 1987), American baseball player
 Dave Adams (Canadian football) (1920–2011), Canadian football guard
 David Adams (gridiron football) (born 1964), gridiron football running back
 David Adams (rugby league), Australian rugby league footballer
 David Adams (tennis) (born 1970), South African tennis player
 Davey Adams (1883–1948), Scottish footballer (Celtic FC)

Other people
 David H. Adams, American cardiac surgeon
 David Adams (video game designer) (born 1975), American video game designer
 David S. Adams (biologist), American biologist known for his work on Alzheimer's disease
 Dave Adams (musician) (1938–2016), British musician from Saint Helier, Jersey
 David Adams (photojournalist) (born 1963), Australian photojournalist and cultural documentary film presenter
 Ryan Adams (David Ryan Adams, born 1974), American musician, songwriter and author
 David Hempleman-Adams (born 1956), British adventurer
 David B. Adams (born 1950), American professor of surgery
 David Adam (priest) (1936–2020), British Anglican priest
 David Adams (Congregationalist divine) (1845–1923), Congregationalist minister and schoolmaster
 David Adams (peace activist) (born 1939), American peace activist, scientist, scholar, writer and journalist
 David Laird Adams (1837–1892), Scottish professor of Hebrew and Oriental languages

See also
 David Adam (disambiguation)
 Adams (surname)